La Gauloise de Basse-Terre is a football club in Guadeloupe, based in the country's capital city Basse-Terre.

They play in Guadeloupe first division, the Guadeloupe Championnat National.

Achievements
Guadeloupe Championnat National: 2
 1971, 1978

Coupe de Guadeloupe: 2
 1946, 2007

Performance in CONCACAF competitions
CONCACAF Champions Cup: 2 appearances
1988– 1st round (Caribbean Zone) – Won against  RKSV Centro Dominguito, further results not known
1990 – Preliminary round (Caribbean Zone) – Lost against  Zénith Morne-à-l'Eau

External links
 Tour des clubs 2008–2009 – Gwadafoot 
 Club info – Guadeloupe Football Federation 	

Gauloise